"You Think You're a Man" is a single by American performance artist Divine, released in 1984. The song also appeared on the compilation album The Story So Far, released the same year. It was written by Geoff Deane, formerly the lead singer and main songwriter with both the Leyton Buzzards and Modern Romance, and his sometime songwriting partner Keith Miller. Geoff Deane later went on to write the cross dressing-themed movie Kinky Boots. 

The song was later covered by the Vaselines in 1987 and appeared on the EP Son of a Gun.

Chart performance
"You Think You're a Man" was the first single produced by Stock Aitken Waterman to reach the UK Top 75 chart, peaking at No. 16 in August 1984 and No. 14 on the Irish Singles Chart.

It spent nine weeks on the German Singles Chart, peaking at No. 32 in September 1984. It was Divine's third Top 40 single on the chart.

The single was also successful in Australia, where it reached No. 8 in October 1984 (for two weeks) and remained on the Kent Music Report Top 100 chart for 18 weeks. It also became Divine's first single to chart on the New Zealand Singles Chart. It debuted and peaked at NO. 27 in March 1985, and spent four weeks on the chart.

Charts

Weekly charts

Year-end charts

Live performances
Divine performed the song "You Think You're a Man" as the featured musical guest on the Australian TV program Countdown on October 7, 1984. Divine also performed on the UK TV program Top of the Pops on July 19, 1984, which resulted in a barrage of complaints.

Media appearances
The song can be heard in a club scene in the third episode of the Channel 4 series It's a Sin. A cover of the song, by dance band Full Frontal, was featured in the British television series Queer as Folk, in the second episode. It was also featured in the series premiere of the North American version. Australian Tim Campbell covered the song on his 2018 album Electrifying 80s.

Track listings
Dutch 12-inch vinyl single
 "You Think You're a Man (Remix)" – 6:26
 "You Think You're a Man (Radio Mix)" – 3:35
 "Give It Up" – 3:05
 	
German 12-inch vinyl single
 "You Think You're a Man (Special Remix)" – 6:26
 "You Think You're a Man" – 8:07

References

External links
 Divine – You Think You’re A Man (Studio, TOTP): Divine performing on Top of the Pops
 Divine – You Think You're a Man (Remix)
 Divine – You Think You're a Man (Extended Video Edit)

1984 songs
1984 singles
Divine (performer) songs
LGBT-related songs
The Vaselines songs
Songs written by Geoff Deane
Song recordings produced by Stock Aitken Waterman